Bourges Foot 18 is a football club located in Bourges, France. It was created as a result of the merger between Bourges Foot and Bourges 18 in 2021.

History 
In July 2020, the merger of the two most significant football clubs in Bourges, Bourges 18 and Bourges Foot, was proposed by mayor Yann Galut. The merger was agreed in principle between the two clubs in September 2020.

Details of the merger were confirmed in April 2021, when the membership of the two constituent clubs voted to approve it. Presidents of the merged clubs would become co-presidents of the new club, called Bourges Foot 18. The club would field its first team in Championnat National 2 (where both constituent teams had last played) and a second team in Championnat National 3. The women's first team would play in Régional 1 Feminine. The club colours would be red and white.

On 5 May 2021, the club confirmed Laurent Di Bernardo, former coach of Bourges Foot, as its head coach.

Squad

References 

Football clubs in France
2021 establishments in France
Association football clubs established in 2021
Sport in Cher (department)
Football clubs in Centre-Val de Loire